Kim Do-jin (born on November 10, 1977), professionally known as Won Bin, is a South Korean actor. He first gained wide popularity in 2000 after starring in the KBS's television series Autumn in My Heart. One of the most selective actors in the Korean entertainment industry, he has starred in only five films to date, Guns & Talks, Taegukgi, My Brother, Mother and The Man from Nowhere. He was Gallup Korea's Film Actor of the Year in 2010 and 2011.

Early life
Won Bin was born and raised in Jeongseon County in Gangwon Province, South Korea. He is the fifth and youngest child, with one brother and three sisters. His father was formerly employed in a mine and his mother worked on a farm; both of his parents are now retired. As was common for other children living in mountainous regions, Won Bin spent most of his time playing around with friends in the mountains and rivers, and later explained: "I came back home most nights at sunset with a black and dusty face." He was frequently shy, introspective, and quiet, character traits that would continue to follow him throughout adulthood. While not talkative or outgoing, he excelled at athletics. Won Bin started taekwondo lessons and now holds a black belt. As a young boy, he initially planned to become a car mechanic due to his interest in car racing and motorcycling. Won Bin graduated from a mechanical high school, where he studied car repair and mechanics.

In November 1995, a cable television station was looking to recruit and hire new actors; Won Bin applied and was accepted in his last semester of high school. He started to take acting classes at the station's headquarters and appeared in several dramas. The following month, Won Bin signed an acting contract with a talent agency.

Career 
Won Bin made his screen debut with a supporting role in the 1997 drama film Propose. His role in Ready Go! (1998) helped hone his acting skills. After Ready Go!, he took a break and entered a college called Paekche Institute of the Arts in 1998 to take acting classes. In 1999, Won Bin came back to the screen with a lead role in drama Kwangki from which he was recognized as a promising young actor and a teen heartthrob.

He made his big breakthrough in 2000 with drama Tough Guy's Love (Kkokji) and Autumn in My Heart. His role as a rebellious youngest son in Kkokji proved his acting potential and his role in the widely successful drama landed him on the A-list for Korean performers. Autumn in My Heart gained wide popularity in Asia and he became one of the most popular Korean actors in Korea and Asia as well. In 2002, Won Bin was involved in the first South Korea and Japan joint production drama Friends.

Won Bin also had roles in a number of popular films, including Guns & Talks and My Brother, but it is his portrayal of the sensitive younger brother in the blockbuster war film Taegukgi (2004) that cemented his international fame. With the success of the critically acclaimed Taegukgi, recognition of his acting skills has reached an ever-wider international audience. Taegukgi was the best selling film in South Korea in 2004 with 11.75 million admissions.

His career was interrupted by his mandatory service to the South Korean Army. After graduating from the Graduate School of Arts in Yong-In University in 2005, Won Bin started his military duty in November 2005 and stationed at the Korean Demilitarized Zone, a position for which he volunteered. On June 2, 2006, the military officially confirmed that Won Bin would be no longer active. The decision was made by the military when Won Bin sustained injury to his ACL. He had undergone surgery and was officially discharged on June 7, 2006. After the surgery, he had gone through rehabilitation program for more than one year to recover from the injury.

Won Bin was appointed as UNICEF Goodwill Ambassador of the Korean Committee  on September 6, 2007. He has participated in various programs and charity events in Korea for UNICEF from that time on, and has appeared in several promotional videos.

In April 2008, Won Bin confirmed that his next film would be Mother directed by Bong Joon-ho. Filming started in September 2008 and finished in February 2009. The film was selected to compete in the Un Certain Regard section of the 2009 Cannes Film Festival. This was followed by the 2010 film The Man from Nowhere, his final film appearance to date.

Personal life 
In July 2013, news broke that Won Bin and actress Lee Na-young were in a relationship. The two got to know each other when Lee joined the same agency as Won in August 2011. The pair started dating a year later in August 2012. Won married Lee on May 30, 2015, in a small, private ceremony in Won's hometown of Jeongseon, Gangwon Province. A press release from their agency Eden 9 in August 2015 announced that the couple were expecting their first child.

Filmography

Film

Television series

Books 
 2000: dream in HEAVEN photobook - 100 pages photo essays with photos taken in Bali, Indonesia and South Korea.
 2002: WWW-Wonbin Wide pinup Web photobook - 40 pages photo essays.
 2005: 28 Day 'n Year Won Bin Premium Box Set - DVD & photobook - 60-minute DVD and 144 pages of photos with sincere essays written by Won Bin revolving around his private life and his photo session trip to South Korea, Czech Republic, and Japan as well as collector's gifts.
 2006: BINUS DVD - To show his gratitude to his fans for their years of support, Won Bin has recorded this candid, personal DVD (60 minutes) to be shared just between him and us, the fans - hence the title BINUS (BINUS is the name of his official fanclub), before fulfilling his mandatory military service. It includes revealing footage and private life, with Won Bin re-visiting many places in his hometown to share with his fans his background and childhood memories.
 2006: Dear Wonbin photobook - Designed like a diary book, with drawings by Won Bin.
 2010: I Love You Private DVD & Photobook - 105-minute DVD and photobook, filmed in Ireland

Charity works 
As a UNICEF Goodwill Ambassador, Won Bin has participated in various programs and charity events.

 2007.09.06 - Appointed as UNICEF Goodwill Ambassador.
 2007.10.03 - Attended the International Peace Marathon Festival in Seoul to raise fund for UNICEF.
 2007.11.26 - Attended a charity fashion show to raise fund for UNICEF.
 2008.02.28 - Attended the "Clean meals, Happy sharing" campaign sponsored by UNICEF and Hanwha Resort.
 2008.06.24 - Promoting the Awoo Doll campaign.
 2008.08.20 - Raised fund through photo project with Louis Vuitton and GQ Korea.
 2008.11.27 - Promoting UNICEF Jumper to raise fund.
 2008.12.22 - Visited an orphanage in Seoul and presented the children there with Christmas gifts.
 2009.04.04-13 - Visited Gambia for UNICEF, visited relief center, hospital and schools.
 2010.09.12-17 - Visited East Timor for UNICEF. watched over the vaccinations and educational work being done on site by UNICEF.

In popular culture
Many entertainers in South Korea see Won Bin as one of the best examples of a good looking man.

He was mentioned in the lyrics of Ladies' Code's single Kiss Kiss, composed by Super Changddai. The lyrics said, "난 오늘밤 꿈에서 난 원빈 오빠가 나타나 줄 텐데" (Tonight, in my dreams, Won Bin oppa will appear). Members of the South Korean boy group iKON had also mentioned him on several of their songs. Bobby said in the lyrics of his rap verse on Masta Wu's single Come Here, "실력이 외모면 난 방탄 유리 앞에 원빈." (If skill equals to looks, I'm Won Bin in front of a bulletproof glass.) Won Bin's character in The Man from Nowhere was referenced by Krystal Jung in the 2013 drama The Heirs, as well as by iKON's B.I in the lyrics of his song with co-member Bobby, Anthem wherein he said, "날고 기어도 다 씹어 먹어줄게 Call me 아저씨." (We'll chew you up like raw meat, call me ahjusshi.) In the 2015 Korean drama Kill Me, Heal Me, the character of Park Seo-joon, Oh Ri-on, told Secretary Ahn that the elusive Writer Omega's looks were rumored to be "on the Won Bin level." In 2016 drama Guardian: The Lonely and Great God, Kim Go-eun's character mentioned Won Bin when Lee Dong-wook's character asked for "a male name that women love".

Awards and nominations

Other awards/honors
 2002: BVLGARI Brilliant Dreams Award (Japan)
 2007: Appointed as UNICEF Goodwill Ambassador
 2011: Best Jewellery Wearer Award (Japan)

Magazine/media recognition
 2000: Best Dresser of the year
 2002: Voted as the "April 2002 Most Beautiful Man" by MostBeautifulMan.com. The first Asian celebrity to win in this monthly poll.
 2005: Voted #1 "Favorite Asian Star" (2005) in the readers' survey by Japanese magazine "CanCam".
 2005: Voted #1 "Favorite Asian Star" (2005) in the readers' survey by Japanese magazine "an.an".
 2006: Voted #1 "Favorite Asian Star" (2006) in the readers' survey by Japanese magazine "an.an".
 2007: Voted #1 "Favorite Asian Star" (2007) in the readers' survey by Japanese magazine "an.an".

Listicles

References

External links 

 Won Bin Official Website
 
 
 

 
 

UNICEF Goodwill Ambassadors
20th-century South Korean male actors
21st-century South Korean male actors
South Korean male film actors
South Korean male television actors
South Korean male models
South Korean male taekwondo practitioners
Yong In University alumni
People from Gangwon Province, South Korea
1977 births
Living people
Best New Actor Paeksang Arts Award (television) winners